William Raymond McCartney (born 1 August 1947) is a Scottish former footballer who played for Port Vale and Durban City F.C..

Career
McCartney played youth football for Rangers, before becoming one of numerous Scotsmen to sign with English side Port Vale in June 1966, then managed by Jackie Mudie. He played 15 Fourth Division matches during the 1966–67 season, scoring once against Aldershot at the Recreation Ground on 29 October; he also appeared once in the FA Cup. He was released in May 1967, and moved on to Welsh side Oswestry Town.

Career statistics
Source:

References

1947 births
Living people
Footballers from Edinburgh
Scottish footballers
Association football forwards
Rangers F.C. players
Port Vale F.C. players
Oswestry Town F.C. players
English Football League players